Yuka Takaoka (高岡由佳, Takaoka Yuka, born January 28, 1998) is a Japanese woman who was convicted of attempted murder for stabbing her boyfriend in Shinjuku, Tokyo, in May 2019. Takaoka gained an online following due to the circumstances of the attack and her physical appearance, being described by the media as the "real life yandere", a term in Japanese anime used to describe a girl who suddenly becomes aggressive, deranged, and homicidal towards a lover.

Takaoka was found guilty of attempted murder in December 2019, and was sentenced to  years in prison.

Attack on Phoenix Luna 
Yuka Takaoka was an employee at a girls' hostess club in Shinjuku Ward, Tokyo. In October 2018, she met her boyfriend Phoenix Luna, who was a bar worker at the Fusion nightclub, which is located in the Kabukicho red-light district. Original reports stated that the couple moved into an apartment together on May 20, 2019, but Luna later disputed this.

On May 23, 2019, Takaoka was looking at Luna's cell phone after he had come home late, and claimed that she saw photos of Luna being intimate with another woman. Takaoka said she became sad, and both wanted Luna dead and wanted to die herself. She then stabbed Luna in the abdomen in his sleep. She then took a bloodied Luna to the lobby of their residence. In a now-infamous photo, Takaoka is shown sitting on the floor of the residence lobby and ignoring officers arriving at the scene, with her legs covered in Luna's blood while smoking a cigarette and calling through her cell phone. Takaoka claimed that, "Since I loved him so much, I just couldn’t help it. After killing [him], I, too, wanted to die." She was arrested and charged with attempted murder. Luna was hospitalized in critical condition, but survived the attack.

Aftermath

Social media attention 
Following the attack, Takaoka gained online notoriety due to her perceived attractive appearance among the online public and similarities to a "Yandere", a term in anime used to describe a psychotic and often homicidal girl obsessed with a lover after perceived betrayal. Users on Instagram had described Takaoka as a "too beautiful criminal." Social media users created fan-made photos and videos, in addition to paintings and drawings dedicated to her in what was described in the media as a dark fascination with the crime. Kenji Nakano of Tokyo Reporter and Marnie O'Neill of News.com.au wrote that Takaoka's fanbase is an example of a broader and troubling online phenomenon towards attractive criminals, nearly akin to celebrity worship.

Legal proceedings 
Takaoka was tried for the attempted murder of Luna in December 2019. She was found guilty on December 3, 2019, with Takaoka sobbing as the verdict was read. The prosecution sought a prison term of 5 years. On December 5, 2019, she was sentenced to  years in prison, with the judge calling Takaoka's crime "selfish" and that she had a "strong intent to kill." Luna stated that he did not hold a grudge against Takaoka, stating, "If possible, I want people to be able to lead a normal life rather than paying for their sins." Before the trial, Luna had settled a lawsuit out-of-court against Takaoka for ¥5,000,000 (US$39,271).

References 

1998 births
2019 in Japan
2019 crimes in Japan
21st-century Japanese criminals
Domestic violence
People from Tokyo
Japanese female criminals
Living people
Stabbing attacks in 2019
Violence against men in Asia
Violence against men